Zhujia (Tibetan:) is a village in Lhünzhub County in the Lhasa Prefecture of Tibet Autonomous Region, in China. It appears to have been a township of Lhünzhub County, covering 126 square kilometers, with a population of 4000 at one point, with 12 village committees. However, the National Bureau of Statistics now lists Zhujia as a village and no longer as an official township-level division of Lhünzhub County.

See also

References

Populated places in Lhasa (prefecture-level city)
Lhünzhub County